Oechalius ohausi is a species of beetle in the family Carabidae, the only species in the genus Oechalius.

References

Lebiinae